This is a list of properties and historic districts in Stoneham, Massachusetts, that are listed on the National Register of Historic Places.

The locations of National Register properties and districts (at least for all showing latitude and longitude coordinates below) may be seen in an online map by clicking on "Map of all coordinates".

Current listings

|}

References

Stoneham, Massachusetts
Stoneham
Stoneham, Massachusetts